Victory City is a novel by Salman Rushdie published in February 2023. It is Rushdie's fifteenth novel.

Writing and publication
Ahead of publication, it was announced that due to the attack on Rushdie in 2022, he would not be promoting the novel in public, though he did publish several tweets and speak to The New Yorker and WNYC Studios about it. The novel was finished before Rushdie was attacked.

Summary
Victory City is framed as a fictional translation of an epic originally written in Sanskrit. The narrator and protagonist is Pampa Kampana, partly inspired by the historical, fourteenth-century princess-poet Gangadevi, who is given (or cursed with) a 247-year lifespan. Through her magical powers, she wills into existence the empire Bisnaga, and its capital city of the same name, inspired largely by the historical fourteenth- to sixteenth-century Empire of Vijayanagara, and rules it as what one review calls "a sort of feminist utopia", variously as a minister, regent, and queen consort, for over two hundred years. Her reign includes affairs with Portuguese adventurers and turning people into animals with her spells, and covers multiple generations. Eventually, Bisnaga is brought down by political intrigue, competing neighbours, and religious bigotry.

Critical reception
According to literary review aggregator Book Marks, the novel received mostly reviews characterized by the site as "Rave" or "Positive".

References

2023 novels
Novels by Salman Rushdie
Novels set in India
Random House books
Jonathan Cape books
English-language books
2023 British novels